Sol B River (born 2 October) is a British writer, director, producer and actor best known for his theatre productions, born Leeds, Yorkshire, England, of (Jamaican) parentage. He was introduced as Writer in Residence (1994–96) to the West Yorkshire Playhouse Leeds by Artistic Director Jude Kelly after writing Moor Masterpieces as his first commissioned production. He immediately became one of the most important and enigmatic theatrical voices in Britain, his work being noted as having power and authority by Time Out magazine, while The Guardian compared his production of To Rhatid to writing like Samuel Beckett on amphetamines.

In 1996 he received rave reviews for his first London production To Rhatid, directed by Yvonne Brewster and performed by Angela Wynter, produced by Talawa Theater at the Young Vic Studio Theater.
 
In 1998 he wrote the famous Jamaican story The White Witch of Rose Hall and the world premiere was produced in Jamaica as part of the University of the West Indies 50th anniversary at the Philip Sherlock Centre and directed by Brian Heap. The play had failed to receive a production in Britain.

In 1998 River Plays 1, which includes "Moor Masterpieces", "To Rhatid" and "Unbroken", was published by Oberon Books, London, as part of their Modern Playwrights series, making Sol B River the first living black writer to be published by Oberon.

A further collection of River's work was published as River Plays 2 by Oberon Books. in 2000.

His work also includes Unbroken 1998, commissioned by Phoenix Dance Theatre and choreographed by Thea Barnes a piece that saw dancers perform to spoken word. 48/98 commissioned by Talawa Theatre Company for the Zebra Crossing 2 season was performed at The Lyric Studio 1998 directed by Ben Thomas was the recipient of the Barclays Extra Performance Award.

In 1998 River directed Brace Yourself, a dance documentary on RJC for Channel 4. His work during the 1990s caused Jane Edwards at Time Out magazine to say "River's power and authority makes one eager to see what he's going to do next" and for Lyn Gardner of The Guardian to say "River writes like Beckett on amphetamines". Pride Magazine called him "The thinking woman's crumpet" and voted him number 8 in their special edition of the sexiest black men in Britain, while also calling him "probably the most exciting young black writer of the Nineties."

In 1999 he directed the award-winning short film The Bitterest Pill starring Radio 1 DJ Sara Cox.

In 2001 he directed the documentary Glass Ceiling for Channel Four, featuring Treva Etienne, Clarke Peters, Ricco Ross, Rodney Charles and Kolton Lee 

River has also made various acting appearances that include Get up Stand Up to ITV Yorkshire's Emmerdale Farm.

For BBC Radio 4 he has written Making Waves (2000), Walk Against Fear (2000) with James Meredith and Drive On (2002).

In 2003 he wrote and was Associate Director for Two Tracks & Text Me, West Yorkshire Playhouse. Zenobia Tiley of BBC Online called it "One of the most thought provoking performances I've ever seen. Modern, moving and mighty", while Lynne Walker of The Independent wrote: "Such delight to be had in River’s clever and original way with words – it had me on the edge of my seat." The production of Two Tracks and Text Me was said to have had the most lighting cues in the history of West Yorkshire Playhouse productions. River is said to have wanted to take a break from writing at the end of the production.

In 2005–06 he became Associate Director at the Contact Theatre in Manchester. From 2003 to 2008 he became the Royal Literary Fund Fellow and Advisory Fellow at Chester College, Arden College, Manchester, Trinity and All Saints College Leeds, and York St John University.

References

External links 
The Independent
"Sol B River Interview", WriteWords
Race in the Media Awards

English male television actors
English theatre directors
English theatre managers and producers
English writers
Living people
Year of birth missing (living people)